The Alderton School was built in 1915, the two-story brick schoolhouse and brick gymnasium reflect the second period of rural school development in the county. The buildings are among the few extant properties associated with the development of Alderton, and one of only two rural school buildings remaining in Central Pierce County.

Historical
Pierce County was settled in the 19th century by families attracted by the area's vast forests, rich mineral deposits, fertile farmland, and saltwater harbors. In Alderton, the economy was dominated by extractive industries—principally logging and farming. Extractive economies lead to the creation of widely scattered rural communities near the resources.  They are often inaccessible to urban areas. While Tacoma had a diversified economy based on heavy industry, trade, and transportation, the sparsely settled rural areas dominated by a single economic mainstay.

Appearance
The School is a two-story brick structure. It is located at the crossroad or Washington State Route 162 (Military Road) and N 96th E, near the community founder's home and an older store. Next to the schoolhouse is the brick gymnasium. Both structures were built in 1915.  An older wood frame building was replaced by these buildings.
The school building is constructed of Clay City brick (a local product), is two stories in high, and is rectangular in shape. It has a front bay with an interior stair. A rear addition houses the furnace. A truncated hip roof is irregular. A chimney with a metal hood is placed on the rear slope. The front and rear wings have flat roofs. Previously the parapet over the front door had a school sign board.

Bibliography
Bonney, William Pierce, History of Pierce County, Chicago, 1927.
Auditor's Annual Exhibit, Pierce County, Washington, Tacoma Bell Press, 1910.

References

National Register of Historic Places in Pierce County, Washington